Veronica triphyllos is a species of flowering plant in the plantain family known by the common name finger speedwell, or fingered speedwell. It is native to Europe and western Asia, and it can be found elsewhere as an introduced species, for example, in some parts of the United States. It is an annual herb growing from a taproot and producing a hairy, glandular, branching or unbranched stem up to about 20 centimeters in maximum height. The deeply lobed leaves are rarely more than a centimeter in length. The hairy blades are borne in opposite pairs on the stem. The inflorescence at the tip of the stem produces deep blue flowers a few millimeters wide.

External links
Jepson Manual Treatment
Washington Burke Museum
Photo gallery

triphyllos
Plants described in 1753
Taxa named by Carl Linnaeus